This article describes periodic points of some complex quadratic maps. A map is a formula for computing a value of a variable based on its own previous value or values; a quadratic map is one that involves the previous value raised to the powers one and two; and a complex map is one in which the variable and the parameters are complex numbers. A periodic point of a map is a value of the variable that occurs repeatedly after intervals of a fixed length.

These periodic points play a role in the theories of Fatou and Julia sets.

Definitions

Let 

Periodic points of a complex quadratic mapping of period  are points  of the dynamical plane such that 

where  is the smallest positive integer for which the equation holds at that z.

We can introduce a new function: 

so periodic points are zeros of function : points z satisfying

which is a polynomial of degree

Number of periodic points
The degree of the polynomial  describing periodic points is  so it has exactly  complex roots (= periodic points), counted with multiplicity.

Stability of periodic points (orbit) - multiplier

 

The multiplier (or eigenvalue, derivative)  of a rational map  iterated  times at cyclic point  is defined as:

Because the multiplier is the same at all periodic points on a given orbit, it is called a multiplier of the periodic orbit.

The multiplier is:
a complex number;
invariant under conjugation of any rational map at its fixed point;
used to check stability of periodic (also fixed) points with stability index  

A periodic point is
 attracting when 
 super-attracting when 
 attracting but not super-attracting when 
 indifferent when 
 rationally indifferent or parabolic if  is a root of unity;
 irrationally indifferent if  but multiplier is not a root of unity;
 repelling when 

Periodic points
 that are attracting are always in the Fatou set;
 that are repelling are in the Julia set;
 that are indifferent fixed points may be in one or the other. A parabolic periodic point is in the Julia set.

Period-1 points (fixed points)

Finite fixed points
These are the points that satisfy . That is, we wish to solve

 

which can be rewritten as

 

Since this is an ordinary quadratic equation in one unknown, we can apply the standard quadratic solution formula:

  and 

Since 
  and  where 

we have .

Complex dynamics

Here different notation is commonly used:

 with multiplier 

and   

 with multiplier 

Again we have

Since the derivative with respect to z is 

we have

This implies that  can have at most one attractive fixed point. 

These points are distinguished by the facts that:
  is:
the landing point of the external ray for angle=0 for 
the most repelling fixed point of the Julia set
 the one on the right (whenever fixed point are not symmetrical around the real axis), it is the extreme right point for connected Julia sets (except  for cauliflower).
  is:
 the landing point of several rays
attracting when  is in the main cardioid of the Mandelbrot set, in which case it is in the interior of a filled-in Julia set, and therefore belongs to the Fatou set (strictly to the basin of attraction of finite fixed point)
parabolic at the root point of the limb of the Mandelbrot set
repelling for other values of

Special cases

In this case, 0 is a superattractive fixed point, and 1 belongs to the Julia set.

Only one fixed point

We have  exactly when  This equation has one solution,  in which case . In fact  is the largest positive, purely real value for which a finite attractor exists.

Infinite fixed point

We can extend the complex plane  to the Riemann sphere (extended complex plane)  by adding infinity:

 

and extend  such that 

Then infinity is:
superattracting
a fixed point of :

Period-2 cycles

for :

Equating this to z, we obtain

This equation is a polynomial of degree 4, and so has four (possibly non-distinct) solutions. However, we already know two of the solutions.

Our 4th-order polynomial can therefore be factored in 2 ways:

First method of factorization

 

 

 

 

 

We already have two solutions, and only need the other two. Hence the problem is equivalent to solving a quadratic polynomial. In particular, note that

 

and

 

Matching these against the coefficients from expanding , we get

  and 

From this, we easily get

  and 

Closer examination shows that:

 and 

meaning these two points are the two points on a single period-2 cycle.

Second method of factorization

The roots of the first factor are the two fixed points. They are repelling outside the main cardioid.

The second factor has the two roots

These two roots, which are the same as those found by the first method, form the period-2 orbit.

Special cases
Then

  and 

both of which are complex numbers. We have . Thus, both these points are "hiding" in the Julia set.
This gives the well-known superattractive cycle found in the largest period-2 lobe of the quadratic Mandelbrot set.

Cycles for period greater than 2

The degree of the equation  is 2n; thus for example, to find the points on a 3-cycle we would need to solve an equation of degree 8. After factoring out the factors giving the two fixed points, we would have a sixth degree equation.

There is no general solution in radicals to polynomial equations of degree five or higher, so the points on a cycle of period greater than 2 must in general be computed using numerical methods. However, in the specific case of period 4 the cyclical points have lengthy expressions in radicals.

In the case c = –2, trigonometric solutions exist for the periodic points of all periods. The case  is equivalent to the logistic map case r = 4:  Here the equivalence is given by  One of the k-cycles of the logistic variable x (all of which cycles are repelling) is

References

Further reading 
 Geometrical properties of polynomial roots
Alan F. Beardon, Iteration of Rational Functions, Springer 1991, 
Michael F. Barnsley (Author), Stephen G. Demko (Editor), Chaotic Dynamics and Fractals (Notes and Reports in Mathematics in Science and Engineering Series) Academic Pr (April 1986), 
    Wolf Jung : Homeomorphisms on Edges of the Mandelbrot Set. Ph.D. thesis of 2002
 The permutations of periodic points in quadratic polynominials by J Leahy

External links

Algebraic solution of Mandelbrot orbital boundaries by Donald D. Cross 
Brown Method by Robert P. Munafo
arXiv:hep-th/0501235v2 V.Dolotin, A.Morozov: Algebraic Geometry of Discrete Dynamics. The case of one variable.

Complex dynamics
Fractals
Limit sets